Rudecindo Ortega Mason was a Chilean politician who served as President of the United Nations General Assembly and Permanent Representative of Chile to the United Nations.

Personal life 
He was born in June 3, 1899 and died in October 10, 1962.

Career 
In 1923, he started teaching at Instituto Nacional General José Miguel Carrera. He served as President on Commission for Education in Chamber of Deputies of Chile. He was Minister for Education during first Pedro Aguirre Cerda ministry.

References 

Presidents of the United Nations General Assembly
Chilean Ministers of Education
Permanent Representatives of Chile to the United Nations
1899 births
1962 deaths